, commonly romanized Fumiyo Kouno, is a Japanese manga artist from Nishi-ku, Hiroshima, known for her 2004 manga Town of Evening Calm, Country of Cherry Blossoms and her 2007 manga In This Corner of the World which got an anime film adaptation in 2016 by MAPPA.

Biography
She was born in Hiroshima in 1968 and began drawing manga when she was in junior high school.  She states that she began drawing manga because her parents would not often buy her manga.  Kōno studied science at Hiroshima University and moved to Tokyo, becoming an assistant to Katsuyuki Toda, Aki Morino, and Fumiko Tanigawa.  Kōno made her commercial debut in 1995 with Machikado Hana Da Yori.  She feels that Osamu Tezuka and Fujiko Fujio were among her early influences, but then she was inspired by Sanpei Shirato's literary style and at present, she takes inspiration from Yu Takita's versatility. She graduated from the University of the Air in 2001 with a major in Humanities.

Works
Selected works. (Titles without an English version are given a literal translation enclosed in quotation marks.)
  (serialized 1995–1996 and 2002–2003, collected 2007, Futabasha), 1 volume
  (serialized 1997–2004, collected 2009, Futabasha), 2 volumes
 Pippira Nōto 1 (2000 Futabasha)
 Pippira Nōto: Kanketsuhen (2004 Futabasha)
  (serialized 1999–2001, collected 2005, Ohzora Shuppan)
  (serialized 2001–2004, collected 2005, Futabasha) (2009 reprint Futabasha)
  (script Akiho Kousaka, serialized 2001–2002, Fukuinkan Shoten Publishers)
  (2003–2004, serialized in Manga Action, Futabasha) (serialized 2002 and 2004, collected 2004, Futabasha)
  (serialized 2004–2006, collected 2006, Futabasha)
  (serialized 2007-2009, collected 2008–2009, Futabasha)

Awards
 Kōno won the 2004 Japan Media Arts Festival Grand Prize (Manga Division) for Town of Evening Calm, Country of Cherry Blossoms
 Kōno won the 2005 Tezuka Osamu Cultural Prize Creative Award for Town of Evening Calm, Country of Cherry Blossoms
 Kōno won the 2009 Japan Media Arts Festival Excellence Prize (Manga Division) for Kono Sekai no Katasumi ni

References

Notes

Citations

External links
 

1968 births
Living people
Women manga artists
Manga artists from Hiroshima Prefecture
Japanese female comics artists
People from Hiroshima
Hiroshima University alumni
Female comics writers
20th-century Japanese women writers
21st-century Japanese women writers